Marysette Agnel (28 August 1926 – 19 July 1958) was a French alpine skier. She competed at the 1952 Winter Olympics and the 1956 Winter Olympics.

References

1926 births
1958 deaths
French female alpine skiers
Olympic alpine skiers of France
Alpine skiers at the 1952 Winter Olympics
Alpine skiers at the 1956 Winter Olympics
People from Chamonix
Sportspeople from Haute-Savoie
20th-century French women